Leave the World Behind is the title of:
 "Leave the World Behind" (song), a dance song by Swedish House Mafia
 Leave the World Behind (novel), a novel by Rumaan Alam
 Leave the World Behind (film), a film based on the novel

See also
 Leave This World Behind